This is a list of Turkish football transfers for the 2022–23 winter transfer window by club. Only transfers of clubs in the Süper Lig are included.

The winter transfer window opened on 1 January 2023, although a few transfers took place prior to that date. The window closed at midnight on 2 February 2023. Players without a club may join one at any time, either during or in between transfer windows.

On 12 February 2023 Gaziantep and Hatayspor withdrew from the league, following the 2023 Turkey–Syria earthquake.

Süper Lig

Adana Demirspor

In:

Out:

Alanyaspor

In:

Out:

Ankaragücü

In:

Out:

Antalyaspor

In:

Out:

Beşiktaş

In:

Out:

Fatih Karagümrük

In:

Out:

Fenerbahçe

In:

Out:

Galatasaray

In:

Out:

Gaziantep

In:

Out:

Giresunspor

In:

Out:

Hatayspor

In:

Out:

İstanbul Başakşehir

In:

Out:

İstanbulspor

In:

Out:

Kasımpaşa

In:

Out:

Kayserispor

In:

Out:

Konyaspor

In:

Out:

Sivasspor

In:

Out:

Trabzonspor

In:

Out:

Ümraniyespor

In:

Out:

References

Transfers
Turkey
2022–23